The Italian regional elections of 1990 were held on 6 and 7 May. The fifteen ordinary regions, created in 1970, elected their fifth assemblies.

Electoral system
The pure party-list proportional representation had traditionally become the electoral system of Italy; it was also adopted for the regional vote. Each Italian province corresponded to a constituency electing a group of candidates. At constituency level, seats were divided between open lists using the largest remainder method with Droop quota. Remaining votes and seats were transferred at regional level, where they were divided using the Hare quota, and automatically distributed to best losers into the local lists.

Results summary

Italian political spectrum, which had been quite blocked since World War II, began to change rapidly. Umberto Bossi's Lega Nord obtained a stunning result in the main election of this round of vote, the choice of the Lombard Regional Council. If the Christian Democracy hugely suffered the League pressure in Northern Italy, it counterbalanced these negative result in Southern Italy. All Italy instead punished the Communists, revolutions in the Eastern Bloc having marked the final decline of the party: Secretary Achille Occhetto understood that an era was finished, and prepared the transition of his group to social-democratic ideas.

Despite these changes, all fifteen councils confirmed their respective political administrations. However, numbers in Northern Italy were too close to allow stable leaderships, and a period of fragmentation was opened in those regions. When these councils expired in 1995, all Italian politics had completely changed.

Results by region
1990 Abruzzo regional election
1990 Apulian regional election
1990 Basilicata regional election
1990 Calabrian regional election
1990 Campania regional election
1990 Emilia-Romagna regional election
1990 Lazio regional election
1990 Ligurian regional election
1990 Lombard regional election
1990 Marche regional election
1990 Molise regional election
1990 Piedmontese regional election
1990 Tuscan regional election
1990 Umbrian regional election
1990 Venetian regional election
 

1990 elections in Italy
Elections in Italian regions
May 1990 events in Europe